The men's triple jump at the 1954 European Athletics Championships was held in Bern, Switzerland, at Stadion Neufeld on 25 and 26 August 1954.

Medalists

Results

Final
26 August

Qualification
25 August

Participation
According to an unofficial count, 22 athletes from 15 countries participated in the event.

 (1)
 (1)
 (2)
 (2)
 (1)
 (1)
 (2)
 (1)
 (2)
 (2)
 (1)
 (2)
 (1)
 (2)
 (1)

References

Triple jump
Triple jump at the European Athletics Championships